Falco may refer to:

Arts and entertainment
 Falco (book series), historical novels by Lindsey Davies
 Marcus Didius Falco, central character of the book series
 "Falco" (song), by Hitomi Shimatani
 Falco (TV series)
 Falco (Groove-On Fight character), a videogame character
 Falco Lombardi, a videogame character from the Star Fox series
Falco Grice, a character from the anime series Attack on Titan

Aviation
 Fiat CR.42 Falco, Italian World War II biplane fighter aircraft
 Reggiane Re.2000 Falco I, Italian World War II fighter aircraft
 Selex ES Falco, an Italian tactical unmanned aerial vehicle
 Sequoia Falco, an aerobatic aircraft

People
 Falco (surname), a list of people with the surname Falco or Falcó
 Quintus Pompeius Falco (c. 70–after 140), ancient Roman senator, general and governor of Britannia
 Falco of Maastricht (died 512), bishop of Maastricht
 Oberto Airaudi (1950–2013), also known as "Falco", Italian philosopher and artist
 Falco (musician), stage name of Johann "Hans" Hölzel (1957–1998), Austrian musician, singer and composer
 Andrew Falkous, known as "Falco", guitarist and frontman of the now-defunct band Mclusky and his new group Future of the Left

Other uses
 Falco (bird), a genus commonly known as falcons
 Falco, Alabama, United States, an unincorporated community
 Falco Electronics, a Mexican electronics company
 Falco KC, Hungarian basketball team
 Aprilia SL1000 Falco, an Italian sports motorcycle

See also 
 De Falco, a surname